Ronny Swiggers (born 1961 in Belgium) from Mechelen is one of Belgium's most successful quiz players. In November 2013 he became European Quizzing Champion, winning the individual competition at the European Championship in Liverpool, beating compatriot Nico Pattyn and Englishman Jesse Honey.

Swiggers came in 2nd place on two occasions in the World Quizzing Championships, being edged by Mark Bytheway in 2008 and by superstar Kevin Ashman in 2009.
Since 2007, he is a member of the Belgian national team. In 2008, he has won the European title with the Belgian national team during the European Championships in Oslo. On that occasion, he also won the pairs competition together with Albert November. He is a six time  Flemish champion (2005, 2006, 2007, 2009, 2010, 2013). He has strong local competition in former European Champion Nico Pattyn.

References

External links
World Quizzing Championships 2010
Flemish article about his 2008 feat

IQA team event gold medalists
Living people
1961 births